Medi1 TV (formerly Medi 1 Sat) is a Moroccan free-to-air TV channel, launched in 2006. The channel broadcasts bilingually in Arabic and French, nationally via terrestrial television and internationally via satellite.

History
Medi1 TV was first launched on 1 December 2006 under the name Medi 1 Sat, broadcasting exclusively on satellite, and was co-jointly owned by public Moroccan and French investors. The channel's launch schedule consisted mainly of news programming focusing on Morocco and Maghreb-related affairs.

In 2009, the French investors sold their shares, which were then acquired by the Moroccan state-owned financial institution Caisse de dépôt et de gestion (CDG), effectively making the channel entirely Moroccan-owned. Abbas Azzouzi was appointed by the Board of Directors as the new CEO in 2010, succeeding its founder Pierre Casalta, who had previously directed its sister network Medi1 Radio.

On 30 October 2010, Medi 1 Sat adopted its current name Medi 1 TV, and introduced a new generalist schedule which included entertainment, debates, investigation, youth, news & sport, and documentaries, in addition to entering the terrestrial Moroccan TV market. The channel projected to cover 74% of national territory by the end of November.

In 2014, Medi1 TV obtained a new operating license after opening its capital to two Emirati media firms, Nekst Investments and Steeds Medias. A new cahier de charges had to be submitted to the Moroccan audiovisual regulator HACA.

On 1 February 2016, Medi1 TV re-devoted its schedule to rolling news and current affairs. It also split into two separate channels the same year, with one devoted to Africa-related programming. In June 2016, Hassan Khiyar, who also currently directs Medi1 Radio, was appointed as the TV network's new CEO. This came as the Board of Directors sought to "change the management model and governance of MEDI1TV with a repositioning strategic as a continuous and permanent news channel, published in partnership with Radio Méditerranée Internationale [Medi1 Radio] as part of a unique project with a national, regional and international vocation." Medi1 TV launched a new look and logo in February 2017.

In 2019, Medi1 TV launched an exclusively Arabic-language channel ("Medi1TV Arabic") as part of its network lineup.

In 2021, the Moroccan public broadcaster SNRT announced a forthcoming plan to acquire Medi1 TV, as well as Medi1 Radio and 2M, reorganizing them into a public holding group by 2024. The CDG, via its subsidiary CDG Invest, moved to acquire the entirety of Medi1 TV following a MAD 105 million (US$11.9 million) buyout, with plans to transfer ownership to SNRT once it meets legal requirements.

See also
 Medi1 Radio
 Communications in Morocco

References

External links
 

2006 establishments in Morocco
Arabic-language television stations
French-language television stations
Television stations in Morocco
Television channels and stations established in 2006
Caisse de dépôt et de gestion
Mass media in Tangier
Mass media companies of Morocco